Tanaocerus koebelei, or Koebele's desert long-horned grasshopper, is a species of desert long-horned grasshopper in the family Tanaoceridae. It is found in North America.

References

Caelifera
Articles created by Qbugbot
Insects described in 1906